Compsomantis ceylonica is a species of praying mantis found in Sri Lanka.

References

Compsomantis
Endemic fauna of Sri Lanka
Insects described in 1929